Ayer me echaron del pueblo  is a 1982 Colombian drama film directed by  Jorge Gaitán Gómez. The film was inspired by the eponymous song written by Jose A. Morales. The plot follows the bitter life of a family of peasants forced to move to the city.

Plot
Inspired by the lyrics of a popular nostalgic song, the film tells the story a family that is forced to leave their rural environment and escape to the big city due to pressure from a powerful landowner who deprives them of their meager properties. Overcome by the difficulties in their new hostile urban environment, the family of peasants descends into a tragic circle of poverty. Trying to survive the man falls from underemployment to delinquency; the wife from working as a housekeeper to prostitution and their children end up in the stormy life of street children.

Cast
Camilo Medina
Stella Suárez
Francisco Amaya
Carlos Barbosa
Hector Rivas
Jose Saldarriaga
Edgardo Roman
Hugo Patiño

Notes

References 
Fundación Patrimonio Fílmico Colombiano. Nieto, Jorge (edit), Largometrajes Colombianos En Cine y Video: 1915-2004, Fundación Patrimonio Fílmico Colombiano, Ministerio de Cultura, 2006,

External links
 

1982 films
Colombian drama films
Films set in Colombia
1980s Spanish-language films